José Antonio Nieto Sánchez, known professionally as Pepón Nieto (born 20 January 1967) is a Spanish actor.

He started his acting career in a 1993 episode of the Antena 3 TV series Farmacia de Guardia. He has appeared in other TV series: Periodistas, La vida de Rita and Los hombres de Paco.

He has also acted in theatre and films. He has performed in several Spanish theatre plays such as  Las Mocedades del Cid, 'El caballero del milagro by Lope de Vega, Don Juan Tenorio and Le Dîner de cons.

Personal life
Nieto publicly came out as gay in 2016.

TV seriesPeriodistas (1998–2002).La vida de Rita (2003).Los hombres de Paco (2005–2010; 2021).
 Sé quién eres (2017), as Inspector Giralt.30 monedas (2020–)Smiley (2022–)

Films
 Perfect Strangers (2017)
 Witching & Bitching (2013) - CalvoBoystown (2008)È già ieri (2004)¡Descongélate! (2003)Los novios búlgaros (Bulgarian Lovers) (2003)La marcha verde (2002)Hombres felices (2001)Llombai (2000)Pepe Guindo (1999)Los años bárbaros (1998)El grito en el cielo (1998)Allanamiento de morada (1998)Cosas que dejé en La Habana (1997)El tiempo de la felicidad (1997)Perdona bonita, pero Lucas me quería a mí (1997)Suerte (1997)Asunto interno (1996)Más que amor, frenesí (1996)Morirás en Chafarinas (1995)La boutique del llanto (1995)Luismi (1995)Días contados'' (1994)

References

External links

1967 births
Living people
People from Marbella
Spanish male television actors
Spanish male stage actors
Spanish male film actors
20th-century Spanish male actors
21st-century Spanish male actors